High Water II is the second studio album by American band The Magpie Salute. It was released on October 18, 2019 under Provogue Records in the UK and Eagle Records elsewhere.

Chart performance
High Water II debuted at number 1 on the UK Official Charts Company's Jazz & Blues albums on October 25, 2019. It also peaked at number 154 on Ultratop's Wallonia charts, number 63 in Germany, number 24 in Scotland, and number 77 in Switzerland.

Critical reception
High Water II was met with "generally favorable" reviews from critics. At Metacritic, which assigns a weighted average rating out of 100 to reviews from mainstream publications, this release received an average score of 74, based on 6 reviews.

Track listing

Personnel

Musicians
 John Hogg – vocals
 Marc Ford – vocals, guitar
 Joe Magistro – drums
 Sven Pipien – vocals, bass
 Matt Slocum – keyboards
 Rich Robinson – vocals, guitar, producer
 Alison Krauss – vocals, fiddle
 Matt Holland – horn

Production
 Chris Athens – mastering
 Joe Jones – assistant engineer
 Sean Genockey – mixer, engineer
 Laurent Chanez – photography

Charts

References

2019 albums
Eagle Records albums
The Magpie Salute albums